The 1914 Cork City by-election was held on 18 February 1914.  The by-election was held due to the incumbent All-for-Ireland MP, William O'Brien resigning the seat in order to recontest it.  O'Brien won it unopposed.

References

1914 elections in Ireland
Elections in Cork (city)
By-elections to the Parliament of the United Kingdom in County Cork constituencies
1914 elections in the United Kingdom
Unopposed by-elections to the Parliament of the United Kingdom (need citation)